Andrew G. Haldane,  (born 18 August 1967) is a British economist who worked at the Bank of England between 1989 and 2021 as the chief economist and executive director of monetary analysis and statistics. He resigned from the Bank of England in June 2021 to become chief executive of the Royal Society for Arts.

In 2014 he was named by Time magazine as amongst the world's 100 most influential people.

Education
Born in Sunderland, Haldane attended Guiseley School in north Leeds. He did not study maths at A-level, teaching himself; he said that he was "very far from being natural at maths" and struggles teaching his children the subject. He received a BA in economics from the University of Sheffield in 1988 and an MA in economics from the University of Warwick in 1989.

Career
Haldane joined the Bank of England in 1989. He worked in monetary analysis, on various issues regarding monetary policy strategy, inflation targeting, and central bank independence. He had a secondment to work at the International Monetary Fund. Haldane's senior experience back in the Bank of England includes heading up the International Finance Division and the Market Infrastructure Division. In 2005 Haldane assumed responsibility for the Systemic Risk Assessment Division within the Financial Stability department. In 2009 he became the Bank of England's executive director of financial stability.

Haldane has been widely cited as a leading Bank of England expert on financial stability and is a co-author with Adair Turner and others of the London School of Economics The Future of Finance report. His 2012 speech, called "The Dog and the Frisbee"—delivered to the Federal Reserve Bank of Kansas City's annual Jackson Hole, Wyoming meeting—received widespread attention in the financial media and prompted Forbes to describe him as a "rising star central banker".  In the speech, Haldane drew on behavioural economics to argue that complex financial systems cannot be controlled with complex regulations.

In October 2012 Haldane said the Occupy movement protesters had been right to criticise the financial sector and had persuaded bankers and politicians "to behave in a more moral way".

Interviewed on the BBC's The World at One radio programme, ahead of the chancellor's 2012 Autumn Statement, Haldane said the financial effect of the bank crisis, i.e., the loss of income and damage to output was as severe as a world war. He feared the cost would fall on the next generation or even the generation afterwards. Public anger was justified as banks had made loans which could never be repaid and these loans were sold on around the world creating the subprime mortgage crisis. The banks still had undeclared risky assets. In the meantime, bankers' pay, which in 1980 was comparable with a doctor or lawyer, had risen to four times that value by 2006 and Haldane said it needs to fall to that of other professions.

Haldane said in a speech on 4 April 2014 to a financial audience that "too big to fail" risks that are being tackled by reforms at major banks were applicable to the asset-management industry, calling it the "next frontier" for macroprudential policy. He introduced the "non-bank, non-insurer globally systemically important financial institutions" (NBNI G-SIFIs) into the lexicon at this event, and detailed the thrust of regulators as "modulating the price of risk, when this is materially mispriced, could be every bit as important as controlling its quantity".

Haldane said in March 2017 that "Bad managers stand accused of holding back economic growth in the UK by undermining productivity, preventing pay and living standards rising."

Haldane said in 2017 the rise in self-employment and drop in union membership mirrors weak workforces of the pre-1750 era. He also said a period of "divide and conquer" had left workers less able to bargain for higher wages. "There is power in numbers. A workforce that is more easily divided than in the past may find itself more easily conquered."

In April 2021, he announced that he was resigning from the Bank of England in June and becoming chief executive of the Royal Society for Arts in September, replacing Matthew Taylor.

In September 2021, Haldane was appointed as the head of the Levelling Up Taskforce in the newly renamed Department for Levelling Up, Housing and Communities, under Secretary of State Michael Gove.

Pro Bono Economics
Haldane and Martin Brookes co-founded a charity "Pro Bono Economics", which aims to persuade economists to donate their time and expertise to help charities on a pro bono basis. It has partnered with charities such as St Giles Trust and Barnardo's. They tapped Gus O'Donnell to help promote the initiative.

It is also backed by Gavyn Davies, former BBC head; Sir Howard Davies, London School of Economics director; Rachel Lomax, former Bank of England deputy director on the Monetary Policy Committee; Adair Turner, who chaired the now-defunct Financial Services Authority; and Jim O'Neill, the Goldman Sachs economist who came up with the term "BRIC".

Personal
Haldane lives in south London with his wife, Emma Hardaker-Jones, who is human resources director at Legal & General. They have three children.

Haldane became a trustee of the independent charity National Numeracy in 2016. He is also an ambassador for the volunteering network REACH.

Honours
In 2016, Haldane was elected a fellow of the Academy of Social Sciences (FAcSS).
In 2019, he was awarded an honorary doctorate from the University of Warwick.
In 2021, he was elected a FRS

Publications
Haldane has authored more than 70 articles and three books on inflation targeting, central bank independence, international financial crises, financial stability frameworks and payment systems, along with notable analysis critical of the remuneration models that divorce capital control from its ownership in the financial services sector, where stewardship bonuses are rewarded regardless of loss or gains to clients, contrary to rational norms of fiduciary duty.

Books
 The Future of Payment Systems: 43 (Routledge International Studies in Money and Banking) with Stephen Millard, and Victoria Saporta (2007)
 Fixing Financial Crises in the 21st Century (Routledge Studies in the Modern World Economy) (2004)

References

1967 births
Living people
Alumni of the University of Sheffield
Alumni of the University of Warwick
British economists
Fellows of the Academy of Social Sciences
Institute for New Economic Thinking